Lushington may refer to

 Edmund Law Lushington (1811–1883), English academic
 Henry Lushington (1812–1855), English colonial administrator, chief secretary to the government of Malta
 Charles Manners Lushington (1819–1864), MP for Canterbury
 Franklin Lushington (1823–1901), British judge and friend of Edward Lear
 Godfrey Lushington (1832–1907), British civil servant and advocate of prison reform
 Kate Lushington, Canadian theatre artist and teacher
 Vernon Lushington (1832–1912), British judge and civil servant
 Alfred Wyndham Lushington (1860–1920), Anglo-Indian botanist
 Augustus Nathaniel Lushington (b. 1869), first African American to earn a Doctorate of Veterinary Medicine
 Stephen Lushington (disambiguation), for people of that name

See also
 Lushington Baronets
 Lushington Falls